Windsor Hanger Western (born October 11, 1988) is an entrepreneur who co-founded Her Campus, an online college magazine geared toward college women. At Her Campus, Hanger Western is currently president and publisher. She is a 2010 graduate from Harvard University with a Bachelor's degree in history of science.

Her Campus

Hanger Western met Stephanie Kaplan Lewis and Annie Wang while the three of them were undergraduates at Harvard. The three of them proposed a business plan for Her Campus, a national online magazine with individualized branches for specific colleges and universities across the country, and won the Harvard Student Agencies Investment Award as a winner in the i3 Innovation Challenge. Her Campus was then launched in September 2009.

Awards

Hanger Western was named to Inc. magazine’s Inc. magazine's "30 Under 30 Coolest Young Entrepreneurs" for 2010, Glamour magazine's "20 Amazing Young Women", and The Boston Globe's "25 Most Stylish Bostonians for 2010  Hanger Western was the 2016 winner of Target Magazine’s Target Marketer of the Year. Hanger Western, Kaplan Lewis and Wang were named to the Forbes 30 under 30 in 2017 as Her Campus Media.

Personal life 
Hanger Western married Alex Western in 2013. She currently resides in Atlanta, Georgia, with her husband and their two daughters.

See also
Ypulse interview
College Media Matters
She Takes On The World interview
Women Grow Business interview
BNet article
Wallet Pop article
College Media Beat

References

Harvard University alumni
Living people
1988 births